Kabhii Sautan Kabhii Sahelii (English: sometimes sister-wives sometimes friends) is a Hindi-language Indian television soap opera that premiered on Metro Gold channel on 19 February 2001 and was later shifted to Star Plus after closure of channel. The series was produced by Ekta Kapoor's Balaji Telefilms.

Plot
Kabhi Soutan Kabhi Saheli is the story of two childhood friends, Tanushree and Sonia. The two are very close and share everything. Things take a strange twist when they discover that they are both married to the same man, Harsh. This tests the purity of their friendship and their ability to face hard realities. Kabhi Soutan Kabhi Saheli is an emotional saga that tests the strengths of relationships.

The series ended with Tanushree and Sonia realising that Harsh is a greedy and unscrupulous man. In a show of strength of character and being strong independent women, they decide to leave him. Tanu goes on to marry her close friend Uday while Sonia chooses to remain single and bring up her daughter. For his many crimes, Harsh is sent off to prison.

Cast

Main
 Anita Hassanandani as Tanushree (a.k.a. Tanu)
 Urvashi Dholakia as Sonia
 Pankit Thakker as Harsh: Husband to both Tanu and Sonia
 Daman Maan as Tanu's Father

Recurring
 Hiten Tejwani as Praveen: Tanu's youngest brother
 Dimple Inamdar as Manisha: Praveen's wife
 Prakash Ramchandani as Viren: Tanu's second elder brother
 Seema Pandey as Kanchan: Viren's Wife
 Neelam Mehra as Tanu's mother
 Kannu Gill as Harsh's Mother
 Ujjwal Rana as Uday Kiran
 Abir Goswami as Ranjeet
 Pooja Ghai Rawal as Tanisha
 Harsh Somaiya as Tanisha's son

References

External links

Balaji Telefilms television series
Indian television soap operas
Metro Gold original programming
2001 Indian television series debuts
2002 Indian television series endings